The Motion Picture News was an American film industry trade paper published from 1913 to 1930.

History
The publication was created through the 1913 merger of the Moving Picture News founded in 1908 and The Exhibitors' Times, founded earlier in 1913.

After being acquired by Martin Quigley in 1930, the publication was merged with Exhibitors' Herald World to form the Motion Picture Herald.

See also
 List of film periodicals

References

External links

 Motion Picture News, Vols. 20–24 (November–December 1919), via Google Books
 Motion Picture News (1913–1930) links at Media History Digital Library

1913 establishments in the United States
1930 disestablishments in the United States
Film magazines published in the United States
Weekly magazines published in the United States
Defunct magazines published in the United States
Magazines established in 1913
Magazines disestablished in 1930
Professional and trade magazines
Magazines published in New York City